A. marina may refer to:
 Acaryochloris marina, a chlorophyll d containing symbiotic species of the phylum Cyanobacteria
 Amycolatopsis marina, a high-GC content bacterium species in the genus Amycolatopsis
 Aurantiacicella marina,a bacterium from the genus of Aurantiacicella
 Aureitalea marina,a  bacterium from the genus of Aureitalea
 Aureivirga marina,a  marine bacterium from the genus of Aureivirga
 Avicennia marina, the grey mangrove or white mangrove, a mangrove tree species

See also
 Marina (disambiguation)